Ladislav Minář (born 18 June 1969) is a Czech football manager. He is currently the sporting director of Sigma Olomouc.

Minář led Zlín in the 2008–09 Gambrinus liga as caretaker manager between the dismissal of previous boss Josef Mazura in the 7th round and the appointment of Stanislav Levý in the 12th round of matches. When Levy was sacked after the team took just one point from five matches, Minář was appointed to take charge of the team for the rest of the season. The club were relegated from the league at the end of the season, and the following season the club failed to win promotion back to the top division, ultimately finishing third in the 2009–10 Czech 2. Liga. Subsequently, Minář left his position at the end of the season.

Minář was appointed caretaker manager at Mladá Boleslav towards the end of the 2010–11 Gambrinus liga. During his short term in charge, the club won the 2010–11 Czech Cup. In September 2012, Minář was again given the job of manager at Mladá Boleslav.

References

External links
 Profile at idnes.cz 

1968 births
Living people
Czech football managers
Czech First League managers
FC Fastav Zlín managers
FK Mladá Boleslav managers